David Andersson (born 25 December 1981)
is a Swedish orienteering competitor and European champion.

He received a gold medal in relay at the European Orienteering Championships in 2006 in Otepää, together with Niclas Jonasson and Peter Öberg.

He received a silver medal in relay at the 2007 World Orienteering Championships in Kyiv, together with Peter Öberg and Emil Wingstedt.

He received a gold medal at the 2001 Junior World Ski Orienteering Championships.

References

External links
 
 

1981 births
Living people
Swedish orienteers
Male orienteers
Foot orienteers
Ski-orienteers
World Orienteering Championships medalists
21st-century Swedish people
Junior World Orienteering Championships medalists